Blood Red Throne are a Norwegian death metal band.  They were formed in Kristiansand, Norway, during the peak of black metal in 1998 by former Satyricon guitarist Daniel «Død» Olaisen and Emperor bassist Terje «Tchort» Schei. Inspired by bands like Death, Cannibal Corpse and Deicide, Blood Red Throne play death metal in a Scandinavian style, mixing old school, traditional and Swedish death with groovy riffs and elements of black metal.  The band has released 10 albums.

History
Blood Red Throne started in 1998 when Død and Tchort (while playing in Satyricon at that time), decided to form their own band. Tchort had been playing death metal since 1989 with his band Green Carnation, which was one of the first death metal bands in Norway, and Død had been a huge fan and of the genre since 1992. Tchort was also the bass player in Emperor in the early 1990s and has been involved with bands like Carpathian Forest and Einherjer. The band soon got in touch with a drummer living in their hometown by the name of Freddy Bolsø, and Blood Red Throne was born.  Soon after bassist Erlend Caspersen joined the newly formed group. The band recorded a demo, entitled Deathmix 2000 with Ronni Thorsen from Trail of Tears providing the vocals. This demo got positive feedback and Blood Red Throne got offers from labels right away. Finally having recruited long-time friend Mr. Hustler as the permanent frontman, the same line-up recorded the debut Monument of Death and released it through Hammerheart Records in 2001. The limited edition included a package called 'The Suicide Kit', which not only contained the actual album, but also a printed razor blade and a poster. The kits were hand numbered in the band member's own blood. Blood Red Throne never did any live shows with this line up, Freddy Bolsø moved back to his hometown and the band had to find a new drummer.

Espen "Beist" Antonsen The Sickening joined and the band recorded Affiliated With The Suffering in 2002 and this was their last album through Hammerheart Records. The band did two European tours and the Inferno Fest with this lineup and Beist left as they were about to record their first album for Earache Records. With the help from Bernt Moen, Blood Red Throne managed to record their third album, Altered Genesis. Altered Genesis was released in 2005 and after this release, Mr. Hustler had to leave the band due to work commitments and Vald was handed the microphone.
To make things easier, Blood Red Throne also had to find a permanent and local drummer, and this led to the recruitment of Anders Haave. He joined the band in 2006 and Blood Red Throne went on a new European tour several live shows until going into the studio to record their fourth album, (Come Death), for Earache Records.

Blood Red Throne released their fifth album, Souls of Damnation on June 1, 2009, through Earache Records. The digipak version of the CD included a DVD to celebrate the bands 10-year career.

Blood Red Throne was confirmed February 7, 2009, to play at the Infernofestival in Oslo which took place April 8–11, 2009.
It was set to take place on the stage called BLÅ, where they played with bands like Terrordrome.

On April 23, 2010, Blood Red Throne announced via a MySpace blog post that guitarist Tchort was leaving due to "work and family commitments" and was being replaced by Ivan "MeathooK" Gujic of Neongod for the remainder of their tours and gigs that year. A short time later, it was announced in another post that 19-year-old Emil Wiksten would be taking over the position of drummer.

The band has toured with Dimmu Borgir, Enslaved and Dawn of Ashes in November–December 2010. They toured with Grave, Pathology and Gigan in August - September 2011.

Members

Current members
Yngve "Bolt" Christiansen - vocals (2011–present)
Daniel "Død" Olaisen- guitar (1998–present)
Ivan "Meathook" Gujic - guitar (2010–present)
Stian "Gunner" Gundersen - bass (2018–present)
Freddy Bolsø - drums (1998-2002, 2015–present)

Former members
Terje "Tchort" Vik Schei - guitar (1998-2010)
Ronny Thorsen - vocals (2000)
Flemming Gluch - vocals (2001-2005)
Osvald "Vald" Egeland - vocals (2005-2011)
Martin Skar Berger - vocals (2015)
Erlend Caspersen - bass (1998-2011)
Ole Bent Madsen - bass (2011-2018)
Espen Antonsen - drums (2002-2004)
Anders Kobro - drums (2005-2007)
Anders Haave - drums (2007-2010)
Emil Wiksten - drums (2010-2013)

Timeline

Discography

Albums
 Monument of Death (2001)
 Affiliated with the Suffering (2003)
 Altered Genesis (2005)
 Come Death (2007)
 Souls of Damnation (2009)
 Brutalitarian Regime (2011)
 Blood Red Throne (2013)
 Union of Flesh and Machine (2016)
 Fit to Kill (2019)
 Imperial Congregation (2021)

Other Releases
 A Taste for Blood (EP) (2002)
 A Taste for Butchery (Split album with Severe Torture) (2003)
 Gore Encore (2018)

References

External links
  https://web.archive.org/web/20141008090124/http://www.earache.com/index2.html
 Blood Red Throne at Encyclopedia Metallum
 kvltsite.com review of Come Death

Norwegian death metal musical groups
Earache Records artists
Musical groups established in 1998
1998 establishments in Norway
Musical quintets
Musical groups from Kristiansand
Sevared Records artists